The 1965 Kentucky Derby was the 91st running of the Kentucky Derby. The race took place on May 1, 1965.

Full results

References

1965
Kentucky Derby
Derby
Kentucky
Kentucky Derby